The year 1734 in science and technology involved some significant events.

Mathematics
 George Berkeley publishes The Analyst, an empiricist critique of the foundations of infinitesimal calculus, influential in the development of mathematics.
 Leonhard Euler introduces the integrating factor technique for solving first-order ordinary differential equations.

Technology

Zoology
 René Antoine Ferchault de Réaumur begins publication of Mémoires pour servir à l'histoire des insectes in Amsterdam.

Awards
 Copley Medal: John Theophilus Desaguliers

Births
 January 23 – Wolfgang von Kempelen, Hungarian inventor (died 1804)
 April 18 – Elsa Beata Bunge, Swedish botanist (died 1819)
 May 23 – Franz Mesmer, German physician (died 1815)
 September 3 – Joseph Wright, English painter of scientific subjects (died 1797)

Deaths
 February 1 – John Floyer, English physician (born 1649)
 April 25 – Johann Konrad Dippel, German theologian, alchemist and physician (born 1673)

References

 
18th century in science
1730s in science